Canadian Journal of Experimental Psychology is a quarterly peer-reviewed academic journal published by the American Psychological Association on behalf of the Canadian Psychological Association in collaboration with the Canadian Society for Brain, Behaviour, and Cognitive Science. It was established in 1947 and covers experimental psychology. Articles are published in English or French. The editor-in-chief is Debra Titone (McGill University).

Abstracting and indexing
The journal is abstracted and indexed in:

According to the Journal Citation Reports, the journal has a 2020 impact factor of 0.878.

Editors-in-chief
The following persons are or have been editors-in-chief:

References

External links

Quarterly journals
American Psychological Association academic journals
Multilingual journals
Canadian Psychological Association academic journals
Experimental psychology journals
Publications established in 1947